"Valerie" is a song by English indie rock band the Zutons from their second studio album, Tired of Hanging Around (2006). The song was later covered by Mark Ronson, with lead vocals provided by Amy Winehouse, reaching number two on the UK Singles Chart in 2007.

Background
In an interview with The Scotsman in May 2008, lead singer Dave McCabe described the writing process of the song: "I could tell you I was inspired by gazing out across the Mersey or walking past Macca's old house, but the truth is I got the idea in a cab on the way to my mum's. The whole song was written before I got there, so 20 minutes, max."

The song's title and theme refer an American friend of McCabe's who was in trouble for driving under the influence. The band's drummer, Sean Payne, called it a "musical postcard to her, saying he is having a hard time and can she come over and see him." In an interview with Vice magazine in June 2019, the subject of the song was revealed to be celebrity makeup artist Valerie Star. She explained that she met McCabe and how she got arrested for driving on a suspended license.

Other uses
The song was used by ITV during the 2006 FIFA World Cup, alongside Primal Scream's "Country Girl" and Kasabian's cover of David Bowie's 1977 song "Heroes". The song was also featured as a playable track in Lego Rock Band.

Both the original and Mark Ronson version featured in British soap opera Emmerdale during the wedding of Eric and Val Pollard in 2008.

Music video
The music video was directed by Scott Lyon. It is set in a prison and shows the Zutons trying to escape.

Track listings
CD 1
"Valerie"
"April Fool"

CD 2
"Valerie"
"I Will Be Your Pockets"
"In the City"
"Valerie" (music video)

7-inch single
"Valerie"
"Get Up and Dance"

Charts

Weekly charts

Year-end charts

Certifications

Mark Ronson and Amy Winehouse version

English musicians Mark Ronson and Amy Winehouse covered "Valerie" for Ronson's second studio album Version (2007). Released as the album's third single on 15 October 2007, the track was first performed by Winehouse on Jo Whiley's Live Lounge show on BBC Radio 1. Singer and director Jordan Galland plays the electric piano on this single. Rolling Stone called the cover Winehouse's only "notable recording" after Back to Black. Winehouse had previously recorded a slower-tempo version of the song, which appeared as a bonus track on the deluxe edition of Back to Black. The song has been featured in 27 Dresses and Amy (2015), a documentary film biography of Winehouse, a U.S. advertisement for Amazon Echo, and the demonstration launch video for the Google Nest Audio.

Background
After "Valerie" became a success in the summer of 2006, it found an unlikely fan in Amy Winehouse, who was invited to contribute to a new project with Mark Ronson. He claimed Winehouse did not listen to anything written after 1967 and that she was struggling to come up with something that would fit the sessions for Ronson's upcoming album Version. After Ronson explained that the album would consist of soul covers of guitar records, Winehouse told him that she might try "Valerie", but Ronson strained to hear her voice singing that song in his head. "I wasn't sure how it would work, but she went into the studio and tried it. I loved it," he said.

Ronson's production of the cover is based around the beat from the Jam's 1982 song "Town Called Malice". Winehouse also recorded a jazzier, acoustic version for Radio 1's Live Lounge, which was issued at the same time as the Ronson collaboration and a success in its own right, possibly due to download confusion, though it was the Ronson version that got airplay.

Chart performance
The single peaked at number 2 on the UK Singles Chart, where it spent 19 consecutive weeks inside the top 20. With sales of 329,490, it became the UK's ninth biggest-selling single of 2007. The single spent 36 consecutive weeks on the UK Singles Chart between September 2007 and May 2008. It re-entered the chart in late June 2008 to take its total to 39 weeks.

The song was released in early 2008 in the Netherlands, quickly gaining airplay and sales. It is Winehouse's most successful song in that country, peaking at Number 1 for four consecutive weeks.

As of January 2015, Ronson and Winehouse's version of "Valerie" had sold 658,353 copies in the United Kingdom, according to the Official Charts Company.

The song has become something of a mixed blessing for McCabe. He said, "I certainly have to try hard sometimes to not think about 'Valerie'. The days it's in my head are when I have to put down the guitar and just forget about writing."

Music video
The single's music video, directed by Robert Hales, was filmed in London on 28 August 2007. It shows Ronson and a group of jazz musicians inviting a woman from the audience onto their stage to "sing" the song (after they notice that Winehouse is not present), followed by (presumably) the woman's friends, in the style of group karaoke—although the women essentially mime to Winehouse's voice. The women doing the lip sync performance have Amy's famous beehive hairstyle, possibly to come across as impersonators.

Track listings
CD single
"Valerie" – 3:39
"Valerie" (Baby J Remix) – 3:36
"Valerie" (The Count & Sinden Remix) – 5:30
"California" (Live from Wireless Festival) – 3:43

Charts

Weekly charts

Solo Amy Winehouse version

Year-end charts

Solo Amy Winehouse version

Decade-end charts

Certifications

|-
! colspan="5"| Solo Amy Winehouse version
|-

Other versions

James Morrison and Panic! at the Disco both covered the song on BBC Radio 1's Live Lounge in 2008.

It was sung by Niamh Perry on the fourth round of BBC's I'd Do Anything in 2008.

It was covered in a parody on Today FM's Gift Grub, prior to Munster's appearance in the 2008 Heineken Cup final, as "Flannery", after Munster hooker, Jerry Flannery.

The Zutons' version of the song is referenced in the 2010 song "She Said" by Plan B.

Glee covered Winehouse's version of the song in the episode "Special Education", as one of the two songs for the season 2 Sectionals, with Santana Lopez (Naya Rivera) singing the lead and Brittany Pierce (Heather Morris) and Mike Chang (Harry Shum Jr.) performing a choreographed dance duet. During the 100th episode of the series they redo the song as a duet with Santana and Brittany singing, backed up by the dancing of Mike and new New Directions member Jake Puckerman (Jacob Artist).

Singer Bruno Mars paid tribute to Winehouse by performing her version of the song at the 2011 MTV Video Music Awards.

Louis Tomlinson of boy band One Direction covered the song during a concert of their 2011 Up All Night Tour.

Dionne Bromfield (Winehouse's goddaughter), Aura Dione, Ivy Quainoo, Caro Emerald and Ina Müller performed the song as a tribute to Winehouse at the 2012 Echo Awards Presentation in Germany.

EastEnders actress Rita Simons sang the song on Children in Need 2013.

American bluegrass band the Brothers Comatose covered the song for their 2016 album City Painted Gold. 

Argentine jazz singer Karen Souza covered the song on her 2017 release Velvet Vault.

References

2006 singles
2006 songs
2007 singles
Amy Winehouse songs
Dutch Top 40 number-one singles
Mark Ronson songs
Song recordings produced by Mark Ronson
Song recordings produced by Stephen Street
The Zutons songs
Deltasonic singles
Columbia Records singles
Island Records singles
Songs written by Dave McCabe